The Israel national handball team is controlled by the Israel Handball Association, and represents Israel in international matches.

European Championship record

Best achievement

The team's biggest achievement was a performance in the European Handball Championship that was held in Sweden in 2002, where it didn't manage to go through the first group stage. In the qualifying playoff games the Israel beat the Republic of Macedonia
. 
Israel's coach in the Championship was Shlomo Hoffman, and its leading players were Idan Maimon, Vladimir Zaikman, Leonid Durashenko, Dudi Balsar and Dovi Yeshua.
Ever since the historic participation at the 2002 championship, the team hasn't managed to pass the preliminary round of qualifications.

Previous Campaigns

World 2007 Qualifiers
In the winter of 2006 the team had failed to qualify to the 2007 world championship after finishing third at the qualifications – behind Austria and Finland.

Euro 2008 Qualifiers
In the winter of 2007 Israel again failed to qualify, this time to the 2008 European Championships. Despite an impressive home win 30:29 against the very strong team of Serbia, Israel lost twice to Macedonia, and finished again finished third, behind Serbia and Republic of Macedonia and ahead of Luxembourg.

World 2009 Qualifiers
In the following winter Israel met Serbian again, at the 2009 World Championships Qualifying. This time it lost both games to Serbia, and finished second (out of three) after beating The Faroe Islands at both games.

Euro 2010 Qualifiers
In the 2010 European Championships Qualifying, held in 2008 and 2009, Israel was drawn into group 5, together with the world champions, Germany, Slovenia, Belarus and Bulgaria.

Israel lost both games to Slovenia, Belarus and Germany, and only won both games against Bulgaria.

The team's captain was Idan Maimon, and its leading players were Avishay Smoler of German team TBV Lemgo, Chen Pomerantz, Tom Matalon, Gal Avraham and goalkeeper Leonid Durashenko.

Team

Current squad
Squad for the 2021 World Men's Handball Championship – European Qualification.

Head coach: Oleg Boutenko

Former coaches
 Eugen Trofin (−1983)
 Israel Brener (1982–1983)
 Moshe Lagil (1983–1984)
 Shlomo Hoffman (1992–2008)
 Gilad Maor (2008–2012) 
 Dragan Đukić (2012–2015)
 Per Carlén (2015–2016)
 Oleg Boutenko (2016–)

External links

IHF profile

Men's national handball teams
Handball in Israel
Handball